The 2004 Big 12 men's basketball tournament was the postseason men's basketball tournament for the Big 12 Conference. It was played from March 11 to 14 in Dallas, Texas at the American Airlines Center. Oklahoma State won the tournament for the 1st time and received the conference's automatic bid to the 2004 NCAA tournament.

Seeding
The Tournament consisted of a 12 team single-elimination tournament with the top 4 seeds receiving a bye.

Baylor removed itself from postseason play, including the conference tournament, before the 2003–04 season due to the Baylor University basketball scandal.  Because of this, Texas Tech got a bye in the first round of the tournament. This would be the first time in the history of the tournament that all the conference's member teams did not participate; it would not happen again until 2022, when Oklahoma State did not participate in the tournament due to an NCAA-imposed postseason ban.

Schedule

Bracket

All-Tournament Team
Most Outstanding Player – Tony Allen, Oklahoma State

See also
2004 Big 12 Conference women's basketball tournament
2004 NCAA Division I men's basketball tournament
2003–04 NCAA Division I men's basketball rankings

References

External links
Official 2004 Big 12 Men's Basketball Tournament Bracket

Big 12 men's basketball tournament
Tournament
Big 12 men's basketball tournament
Big 12 men's basketball tournament
Basketball in the Dallas–Fort Worth metroplex
College sports tournaments in Texas